Dichagyris anastasia is a moth of the family Noctuidae. It is found in eastern Turkey, Iraq, Iran and Israel.

Adults are on wing from August to November. There is one generation per year.

External links
 Noctuinae of Israel

anastasia
Moths of Asia
Moths of the Middle East
Moths described in 1936